Blennidus anxius is a species of ground beetle in the subfamily Pterostichinae. It was described by Tschitscherine in 1898.

References

Blennidus
Beetles described in 1898